James Madison Lee (October 15, 1926 – September 11, 2017) was a lieutenant general in the United States Army who served as commander of United States Army Pacific (Western Command) from 1983 until his retirement in 1985. Enlisting in the Army Air Corps Reserve in 1944, Lee served during World War II. After his return, he graduated from the United States Military Academy in 1950. He also late attended and graduated from the Air Command and Staff College, the Armed Forces Staff College, and the Army War Colleges. Lee also served in the Vietnam War and Korean War, commanding infantry in each. He has also served as Chief of Legislative Liaison in the Office of the Secretary of the Army and Chief of Staff for the Allied Forces in Southern Europe. He retired in 1985 and died on September 11, 2017.

Awards and decorations

References

1926 births
2017 deaths
People from Wilmington, North Carolina
United States Military Academy alumni
United States Army aviators
Recipients of the Distinguished Flying Cross (United States)
United States Army generals
Recipients of the Legion of Merit
Recipients of the Silver Star